Giris Frank Rabinovitch (born July 1947) is chief executive of Sager Group, a firm of property developers based in north London. Rabinovitch is of Canadian nationality, acquired as a result of his grandparents fleeing to Canada in the 1890s and early 1900s to escape the Tsarist pogroms in Russia. He started in property development in his 30s and is currently beginning a project in Islington's Upper Street of 500,000 square feet that will be known as "Islington Square".

References

Canadian real estate businesspeople
1947 births
Living people